Thomas Leslie "Babe" Mason (born 18 August 1934) is a Canadian boxer. He competed in the men's light welterweight event at the 1956 Summer Olympics, while a member of the Canadian Army.

References

External links
 Leslie Mason profile at the Canadian Olympic Association

1934 births
Living people
Canadian male boxers
Olympic boxers of Canada
Boxers at the 1956 Summer Olympics
Place of birth missing (living people)
Light-welterweight boxers